David Thomson (1892 – c. 1950) was a Scottish footballer who played as a left back for Dundee and Scotland. He played in the 1925 Scottish Cup Final which Dundee lost to Celtic.

Known as 'Napper', he received a benefit match against Aberdeen in 1926, and is a posthumous inductee of the Dundee Hall of Fame since 2018.

See also
List of one-club men in association football

References

Sources

External links

London Hearts profile (Scotland)
London Hearts profile (Scottish League)

1892 births
Date of birth missing
Footballers from Dundee
Year of death uncertain
Scottish footballers
Scotland international footballers
Dundee F.C. players
Scottish Football League players
Scottish Football League representative players
Association football fullbacks